Matthew Victor Giordano (born October 16, 1982) is a former American football safety. He was drafted by the Indianapolis Colts in the fourth round of the 2005 NFL Draft. Giordano grew up in Clovis, California and played college football at Fresno City College and University of California, Berkeley.

Giordano was part of the Colts' Super Bowl XLI championship team that defeated the Chicago Bears. He was also a member of the Green Bay Packers, Atlanta Falcons, New Orleans Saints and Oakland Raiders.

Early years
Attending Buchanan High School in Clovis, California, Giordano played a key role as team co-captain in Buchanan's inaugural Valley championship in 2000. His football jersey number was 2 while playing for Buchanan. As a senior, he had five interceptions and 64 tackles while causing three fumbles, and averaged nine yards per carry and 12.6 yards per reception on offense. He broke Buchanan records for longest punt return for a touchdown, most blocked kicks and most interceptions in a game. He was a two-time all (TRAC) Tri-River-Athletic-Conference first-team choice and was also named the Defensive Player of the Year by the Clovis Exchange Club and Buchanan High's Most Outstanding Player in football and track in 2001. Giordano was also crowned individual league champion in the 400 meters in 1999.

College career
Giordano attended Fresno City College for two years. He won All-State honors as a freshman, was a two-time All-Conference pick, and was the Defensive MVP in the Northern California Championship game.

He then played college football with the California Golden Bears, at the University of California, Berkeley. As a senior, Giordano won All-Pacific-10 Conference first-team honors, and was an All-American honorable mention. During his career, he had two interceptions, six pass deflections, one sack, 111 tackles (four for losses), two forced fumbles, and a fumble recovery. He graduated from Berkeley.

Professional career

Indianapolis Colts

The Indianapolis Colts selected Giordano in the fourth round (134th overall) of the 2005 NFL Draft. Giordano played in 15 games as a rookie, starting in the September 11 game. He made 12 tackles and 1 pass deflected.

In 2006, his second season, Giordano played 12 games and made 25 tackles. On December 10 against the Jacksonville Jaguars, Giordano made his first career interception, of David Garrard. Giordano also deflected a pass and made a season-high 9 tackles in the game. On December 18, a Monday night game against the Cincinnati Bengals, Giordano made his first professional start. The Colts won Super Bowl XLI 29-17 over the Chicago Bears on February 4, 2007. On fourth down late in the fourth quarter, Giordano deflected a pass by Rex Grossman to Desmond Clark in a play described as icing the game for Indianapolis.

Giordano started 4 games out of 12 played in 2007 and made 20 tackles, 4 passes deflected, and 2 interceptions. In the season-opening 41-10 victory over the New Orleans Saints, Giordano intercepted Drew Brees and returned the pick 83 yards in the Colts' final touchdown play of the game.

In 2008, Giordano played all 16 regular season games and played on special teams in the Wild Card playoff game against the San Diego Chargers. Giordano made 23 tackles and 1 pass deflected.

Giordano signed a one-year contract with the Colts on April 20, 2009. On September 6, the Colts released Giordano to make room for linebacker Cody Glenn.

Green Bay Packers
On September 23, 2009, the Green Bay Packers signed Giordano after releasing Aaron Rouse. With the Packers in 2009, Giordano played 5 games and made 2 tackles. He was released on March 5, 2010.

New Orleans Saints
Giordano signed with the Atlanta Falcons on March 16, 2010 and participated in training camp with the team before being cut on August 31. Giordano signed with the New Orleans Saints on October 12, 2010 and played 9 games with 3 tackles. In his debut with the Saints on October 17 against the Tampa Bay Buccaneers, Giordano recovered an on-side kick attempt by Tampa kicker Connor Barth in the fourth quarter in New Orleans's 31-6 victory.

Oakland Raiders
The Raiders signed Giordano on August 15, 2011 after Hiram Eugene suffered a serious hip injury in the pre-season opener. He was released on September 3, but was re-signed on September 5. In the 2011-2012 season, Giordano led the team in interceptions along with his 70 tackles.

St. Louis Rams
The Rams signed Giordano on June 15, 2013 after the Rams released rookie free agent safety Don Unamba.

Personal life
Giordano was married March 4, 2005 to Laura Enns of Clovis, California. He was an American Studies major. His great-grandfather is Italian born Ralph Giordano, better known as Young Corbett III, a world welterweight boxing champion in 1933. Matt is the son of Victor and Janet Giordano. Giordano is now a physical education teacher at Buchanan High School. Giordano accepted the position of head coach for the Buchanan Bears football team for 2016 season.

References

External links
Oakland Raiders bio
California Golden Bears bio

1982 births
Living people
American people of Italian descent
Sportspeople from Clovis, California
Sportspeople from Fresno, California
Players of American football from California
American football safeties
Fresno City Rams football players
California Golden Bears football players
Indianapolis Colts players
Green Bay Packers players
Atlanta Falcons players
New Orleans Saints players
Oakland Raiders players
St. Louis Rams players